

Events

Pre-1600
 680 – The Battle of Karbala marks the Martyrdom of Husayn ibn Ali.
 732 – Charles Martel's forces defeat an Umayyad army near Tours, France.
1471 – Sten Sture the Elder, the Regent of Sweden, with the help of farmers and miners, repels an attack by King Christian I of Denmark.
1492 – The crew of Christopher Columbus's ship, the Santa Maria, attempt a mutiny. 
1575 – Roman Catholic forces under Henry I, Duke of Guise, defeat the Protestants, capturing Philippe de Mornay among others.
1580 – Over 600 Papal troops land in Ireland to support the Second Desmond Rebellion.

1601–1900
1631 – Thirty Years' War: An army of the Electorate of Saxony seizes Prague.
1760 – In a treaty with the Dutch colonial authorities, the Ndyuka people of Suriname – descended from escaped slaves – gain territorial autonomy. 
1780 – The Great Hurricane of 1780 kills 20,000–30,000 in the Caribbean.
1814 – War of 1812: The United States Revenue Marine attempts to defend the cutter Eagle from the Royal Navy.
1845 – In Annapolis, Maryland, the Naval School (later the United States Naval Academy) opens with 50 students.
1846 – Triton, the largest moon of the planet Neptune, is discovered by English astronomer William Lassell.
1868 – The Ten Years' War begins against Spanish rule in Cuba.

1901–present
1903 – The Women's Social and Political Union is founded in support of the enfranchisement of British women.
1911 – The day after a bomb explodes prematurely, the Wuchang Uprising begins against the Chinese monarchy.
1913 – U.S. President Woodrow Wilson triggers the explosion of the Gamboa Dike, completing major construction on the Panama Canal.
1918 – RMS Leinster is torpedoed and sunk by UB-123, killing 564, the worst-ever on the Irish Sea.
1920 – The Carinthian plebiscite determines that the larger part of the Duchy of Carinthia should remain part of Austria.
1928 – Chiang Kai-shek becomes Chairman of the Republic of China.
1933 – A United Airlines Boeing 247 is destroyed by sabotage, the first such proven case in the history of commercial aviation.
1935 – In Greece, a coup d'état ends the Second Hellenic Republic.
1938 – Abiding by the Munich Agreement, Czechoslovakia completes its withdrawal from the Sudetenland.
1945 – The Double Tenth Agreement is signed by the Communist Party and the Kuomintang about the future of China.
1954 – The Minister of Foreign Affairs of the Sultanate of Muscat, Neil Innes, sends a signal to the Sultanate's forces, accompanied with oil explorers, to penetrate Fahud, marking the beginning of Jebel Akhdar War between the Imamate of Oman and the Sultanate of Muscat.
1957 – U.S. President Dwight D. Eisenhower apologizes to Ghanaian finance minister Komla Agbeli Gbedemah after he is refused service in a Delaware restaurant.
  1957   – The Windscale fire results in Britain's worst nuclear accident.
1963 – France cedes control of the Bizerte naval base to Tunisia.
  1963   – The Partial Nuclear Test Ban Treaty comes into effect.
1964 – The Tokyo Summer Olympics opening ceremony is the first to be relayed live by satellites.
1967 – The Outer Space Treaty comes into force.
1970 – Fiji becomes independent.
  1970   – Canada's October Crisis escalates when Quebec Vice Premier Pierre Laporte is kidnapped by members of the Front de libération du Québec.
1973 – U.S. Vice President Spiro Agnew resigns after being charged with evasion of federal income tax.
1975 – Papua New Guinea joins the United Nations.
1979 – The Olkiluoto Nuclear Power Plant began operations in Eurajoki, Satakunta, Finland.
1980 – The 7.1  El Asnam earthquake shakes northern Algeria, killing 2,633 and injuring 8,369.
  1980   – The Farabundo Martí National Liberation Front is founded in El Salvador. 
1985 – US Navy aircraft intercept an Egyptian airliner carrying the perpetrators of the Achille Lauro hijacking, and force it to land in Italy.
1986 – A 5.7  San Salvador earthquake shakes El Salvador, killing 1,500.
1997 – Austral Líneas Aéreas Flight 2553 crashes and explodes in Uruguay, killing 74.
1998 – A Lignes Aériennes Congolaises jetliner is shot down by rebels in Kindu, Democratic Republic of the Congo, killing 41 people.
2002 – Iraq War: The United States Congress approves the Authorization for Use of Military Force Against Iraq Resolution of 2002. 
2007 – Sheikh Muszaphar Shukor becomes the first Malaysian in space on board Soyuz TMA-11.
2009 – Armenia and Turkey sign the Zurich Protocols, intended to normalize relations. However, they are never ratified by either side.
2010 – The Netherlands Antilles are dissolved as a country.
2015 – Twin bomb blasts in the Turkish capital Ankara kill 109 and injure 500+.
2018 – Hurricane Michael makes landfall in the Florida Panhandle as a catastrophic Category 5 hurricane. It kills 57 people in the United States, 45 in Florida, and causes an estimated $25.1 billion in damage.
2022 – Ben S. Bernanke, Douglas W. Diamond and Philip H. Dybvig are jointly awarded the Nobel Memorial Prize in Economic Sciences.

Births

Pre-1600
AD 19 – Tiberius Gemellus, Roman son of Drusus Julius Caesar and Livilla (d. 38)
 786 – Saga, emperor of Japan (d. 842)
 867 – Li Siyuan, Chinese emperor (d. 933)
1332 – King Charles II of Navarre (d. 1387)
1344 – Mary of Waltham, duchess of Brittany (d. 1361)
1355 – Zhu Biao, Chinese prince (d. 1392)
1421 – John Paston, English politician (d. 1466)
1486 – Charles III, Duke of Savoy (d. 1553)
1554 – Arnold III, Count of Bentheim-Steinfurt-Tecklenburg-Limburg and Lord of Rheda (d. 1606)
1560 – Jacobus Arminius, Dutch theologian (d. 1609)
1567 – Infanta Catherine Michelle of Spain (d. 1597)
1584 – Philip Herbert, 4th Earl of Pembroke (d. 1649)
1599 – Étienne Moulinié, French composer and director (d. 1676)

1601–1900
1629 – Richard Towneley, English mathematician and astronomer (d. 1707)
1646 – Françoise-Marguerite de Sévigné, French noblewoman (d. 1705)
1656 – Nicolas de Largillière, French painter and academic (d. 1746)
1669 – Johann Nicolaus Bach, German organist and composer (d. 1753)
1678 – John Campbell, 2nd Duke of Argyll, Scottish general and politician, Lord High Commissioner to the Parliament of Scotland (d. 1743)
1684 – Jean-Antoine Watteau, French painter (d. 1721)
1700 – Lambert-Sigisbert Adam, French sculptor and illustrator (d. 1759)
1731 – Henry Cavendish, French-English chemist, physicist, and philosopher (d. 1810)
1780 – John Abercrombie, Scottish physician and philosopher (d. 1844)
1794 – William Whiting Boardman, American judge and politician (d. 1871)
1810 – Alfred Kennerley, English-Australian politician, 10th Premier of Tasmania (d. 1897)
1813 – Giuseppe Verdi, Italian composer and philanthropist (d. 1901)
1819 – Heinrich Joseph Dominicus Denzinger, German theologian and author (d. 1883)
1825 – Paul Kruger, South African soldier and politician, 5th President of the South African Republic (d. 1904)
1828 – Samuel J. Randall, American captain, lawyer and politician, 33rd Speaker of the United States House of Representatives (d. 1890)
1830 – Isabella II of Spain (d. 1904)
1834 – Aleksis Kivi, Finnish author and playwright (d. 1872)
1837 – Robert Gould Shaw, American colonel (d. 1863)
1842 – Emily Dobson, Australian philanthropist (d. 1934)
1858 – Maurice Prendergast, American painter and academic (d. 1924)
1861 – Fridtjof Nansen, Norwegian explorer, scientist, and humanitarian, Nobel Prize laureate (d. 1930)
1864 – T. Frank Appleby, American businessman and politician (d. 1924)
1870 – Louise Mack, Australian journalist, author, and poet (d. 1935)
1872 – Dionysios Kasdaglis, Egyptian-Greek tennis player (d. 1931)
1877 – William Morris, 1st Viscount Nuffield, English businessman and philanthropist, founded Morris Motors (d. 1963)
1884 – Nikolai Klyuev, Russian poet and author (d. 1937)
  1884   – Ida Wüst, German actress and screenwriter (d. 1958)
1885 – Walter Anderson, Belarusian-German ethnologist and academic (d. 1962)
  1885   – Jean Peyrière, French actor (d. 1965)
1889 – Han van Meegeren, Dutch painter and forger (d. 1947)
1895 – Alfred Neuland, Estonian weightlifter (d. 1966)
  1895   – Fridolf Rhudin, Swedish actor (d. 1935)
  1895   – Wolfram Freiherr von Richthofen, German field marshal (d. 1945)
1898 – Lilly Daché, French-American fashion designer (d. 1989)
1900 – Helen Hayes, American actress (d. 1993)

1901–present
1901 – Alberto Giacometti, Swiss sculptor and painter (d. 1966)
1902 – K. Shivaram Karanth, Indian journalist, author, and activist (d. 1997)
1903 – Prince Charles, Count of Flanders (d. 1983)
  1903   – Vernon Duke, Russian-American composer and songwriter (d. 1969)
  1903   – Bei Shizhang, Chinese biologist and academic (d. 2009)
1905 – Aksella Luts, Estonian actress, screenwriter, dancer, and choreographer (d. 2005)
1906 – Paul Creston, American composer and educator (d. 1985)
  1906   – Fei Mu, Chinese director and screenwriter (d. 1951)
  1906   – R. K. Narayan, Indian author (d. 2001)
1908 – Johnny Green, American conductor and composer (d. 1989)
  1908   – Mercè Rodoreda, Catalan author and poet (d. 1983)
1909 – Robert F. Boyle, American production designer and art director (d. 2010)
1910 – Julius Shulman, American photographer and environmentalist (d. 2009)
1911 – Clare Hollingworth, English journalist and author (d. 2017)
1912 – Ram Vilas Sharma, Indian poet and critic (d. 2000)
1913 – Claude Simon, Malagasy-French novelist and critic, Nobel Prize laureate (d. 2005)
1914 – Tommy Fine, American baseball player and businessman (d. 2005)
  1914   – Ivory Joe Hunter, American singer-songwriter and pianist (d. 1974)
1915 – Harry Edison, American trumpet player and composer (d. 1999)
1917 – Thelonious Monk, American pianist and composer (d. 1982)
1919 – Willard Estey, Canadian academic and jurist (d. 2002)
  1919   – Gerry Gomez, Trinidadian cricketer, manager, and umpire (d. 1996)
  1919   – Kim Ki-young, South Korean director, screenwriter, producer, and editor (d. 1997)
  1919   – William Kruskal, American mathematician and statistician (d. 2005)
  1919   – Edgar Laprade, Canadian ice hockey player (d. 2014)
1920 – Gail Halvorsen, American air force pilot known as the "Berlin Candy Bomber." (d. 2022)
1922 – Merv Pregulman, American football player, businessman, and philanthropist (d. 2012)
1923 – Louis Gottlieb, American singer and bass player (d. 1996)
  1923   – Nicholas Parsons, English actor and game show host (d. 2020)
  1923   – Murray Walker, English journalist and sportscaster (d. 2021)
1924 – James Clavell, Australian-American director, producer, screenwriter, and author (d. 1994)
  1924   – Ludmilla Tchérina, French actress, ballerina, and choreographer (d. 2004)
  1924   – Ed Wood, American actor, director, producer, screenwriter (d. 1978)
1926 – Oscar Brown, American singer-songwriter, playwright, and actor (d. 2005)
  1926   – Richard Jaeckel, American actor (d. 1997)
1927 – Dana Elcar, American actor and director (d. 2005)
  1927   – Jon Locke, American actor (d. 2013)
  1927   – Thomas Wilson, American-Scottish composer and educator (d. 2001)
1928 – Leyla Gencer, Turkish soprano (d. 2008)
  1928   – Sheila Walsh, English author (d. 2009)
1929 – Ayten Alpman, Turkish singer (d. 2012)
  1929   – Herb Levinson, American actor (d. 2012)
  1929   – Bernard Mayes, English-American journalist and academic (d. 2014)
1930 – Eugenio Castellotti, Italian race car driver (d. 1957)
  1930   – Yves Chauvin, French chemist and academic, Nobel Prize laureate (d. 2015)
  1930   – Harold Pinter, English playwright, screenwriter, director Nobel Prize laureate (d. 2008)
  1930   – Adlai Stevenson III, American lawyer and politician (d. 2021)   
1932 – Harry Smith, English footballer
1933 – Jay Sebring, American hair stylist and businessman (d. 1969)
1935 – Khalil al-Wazir, Palestinian commander, founded Fatah (d. 1988)
  1935   – André Bureau, Canadian lawyer and businessman (d. 2019)
  1935   – Judith Chalmers, English television host and actress
1936 – Gerhard Ertl, German physicist and chemist, Nobel Prize laureate
1937 – Bruce Devlin, Australian golfer and sportscaster
  1937   – Peter Underwood, Australian lawyer and politician, 27th Governor of Tasmania (d. 2014)
1938 – Oleg Gordievsky, Russian intelligence officer and author
  1938   – Daidō Moriyama, Japanese photographer
  1938   – Lily Tuck, American novelist and short story writer
  1938   – Leroy Hood, American biologist and academic
1940 – Winston Churchill, English journalist and politician (d. 2010)
1941 – Peter Coyote, American actor, director, and screenwriter
  1941   – Ken Saro-Wiwa, Nigerian author and activist (d. 1995)
1942 – Janis Hansen, American singer and author (d. 2017)
  1942   – Radu Vasile, Romanian historian and politician, 57th Prime Minister of Romania (d. 2013)
1943 – Frederick Barthelme, American novelist and short story writer
1945 – Christopher Hill, English bishop
  1945   – Vanburn Holder, Barbadian cricketer
  1945   – Headman Shabalala, South African bass singer (d. 1991)
1946 – Charles Dance, English actor, director, and screenwriter
  1946   – Naoto Kan, Japanese lawyer and politician, 61st Prime Minister of Japan
  1946   – Peter Mahovlich, Canadian ice hockey player and coach
  1946   – Anne Mather, English author and screenwriter
  1946   – John Prine, American singer-songwriter and guitarist (d. 2020)
  1946   – Raymond Tallis, English physician, philosopher, author, and academic
  1946   – Chris Tarrant, English radio and television host
  1946   – Ben Vereen, American actor, singer, and dancer
  1946   – Willard White, Jamaican-English actor and singer
1947 – Gary Beach, American actor and singer (d. 2018)
  1947   – Giant Haystacks, English wrestler (d. 1998)
  1947   – Ojārs Arvīds Feldbergs, Latvian sculptor
1948 – Sue Campbell, Baroness Campbell of Loughborough, English academic and businesswoman
  1948   – Cyril Neville, American R&B percussionist and singer
  1948   – Séverine, French singer and actress
1949 – Warren Burt, American-Australian composer
  1949   – Lance Cairns, New Zealand cricketer
  1949   – Wang Wanxing, Chinese activist
1950 – Charlie George, English footballer
  1950   – Nora Roberts, American author
1951 – Epeli Ganilau, Fijian general and politician, 16th Minister for Fijian Affairs
  1951   – Kevin McFoy Dunn, American guitarist, songwriter and producer
1952 – Bob Nystrom, Swedish ice hockey player
  1952   – Dela Smith, English educator
1953 – Fiona Rae, Scottish painter
  1953   – Midge Ure, Scottish singer-songwriter, guitarist, and producer 
  1953   – Aleksander Veingold, Estonian chess player and coach
  1953   – Gus Williams, American basketball player
1954 – Rekha, Indian actress
  1954   – David Lee Roth, American singer-songwriter and producer 
  1954   – Fernando Santos, Portuguese footballer and manager
1956 – Amanda Burton, Northern Irish actress and producer
  1956   – David Hempleman-Adams, English businessman and adventurer
  1956   – Taur Matan Ruak, East Timorese politician, 3rd President of East Timor
1957 – Rumiko Takahashi, Japanese author and illustrator
1958 – Tanya Tucker, American singer-songwriter and guitarist
1959 – Michael Cobley, English-Scottish author
  1959   – Kirsty MacColl, English singer-songwriter (d. 2000)
  1959   – Bill Rammell, English academic and politician, Minister of State for the Armed Forces
  1959   – Julia Sweeney, American actress, comedian, producer, and screenwriter
  1959   – Bradley Whitford, American actor and producer
  1959   – Arif Peçenek, Turkish football player and manager (d. 2013)
1960 – Ron Flockhart, Canadian ice hockey player
  1960   – Eric Martin, American singer-songwriter 
  1960   – Russell Slade, English football manager
  1960   – Paul Thiebaud, American art dealer (d. 2010)
  1960   – Simon Townshend, English singer-songwriter, guitarist, and producer 
1961 – Scott Hoffman, American drummer 
  1961   – Henrik Jørgensen, Danish runner (d. 2019)
  1961   – Martin Kemp, English singer-songwriter and bass player 
1962 – Thomas Rusch, German photographer
1963 – Jolanda de Rover, Dutch swimmer
  1963   – Anita Mui, Hong Kong singer and actress (d. 2003)
  1963   – Daniel Pearl, American-Israeli journalist (d. 2002)
  1963   – Vegard Ulvang, Norwegian skier
1964 – Sarah Lancashire, English actress and director
  1964   – Crystal Waters, American singer-songwriter, musician and producer
1965 – Toshi, Japanese singer-songwriter and producer 
  1965   – Chris Penn, American actor (d. 2006)
  1965   – Rebecca Pidgeon, American-English singer-songwriter and actress
1966 – Tony Adams, English footballer and manager
  1966   – Bai Ling, Chinese-American model and actress
  1966   – Derrick McKey, American basketball player
1967 – Michael Giacchino, American composer
  1967   – Jonathan Littell, American-French author and humanitarian
  1967   – Mike Malinin, American drummer and producer 
  1967   – Gavin Newsom, American businessman and politician, 40th and current Governor of California
  1967   – Jacek Zieliński, Polish footballer and coach
1968 – Bart Brentjens, Dutch cyclist
  1968   – Feridun Düzağaç, Turkish singer-songwriter
  1968   – Chris Ofili, British painter
  1968   – Marinos Ouzounidis, Greek footballer and manager
1969 – Manu Bennett, New Zealand-Australian actor
  1969   – Francis Escudero, Filipino lawyer and politician
  1969   – Brett Favre, American football player
  1969   – Shawn Jamison, American basketball player and coach
  1969   – Wendi McLendon-Covey, American actress
  1969   – Dilsa Demirbag Sten, Swedish journalist and author
1970 – Dean Kiely, Irish footballer
  1970   – Silke Kraushaar-Pielach, German sled racer
  1970   – Matthew Pinsent, English rower and sportscaster
1971 – Graham Alexander, English-Scottish footballer and manager
  1971   – Ian Bennett, English footballer
  1971   – Evgeny Kissin, Russian pianist
1972 – Jun Lana, Filipino director, producer, playwright, and screenwriter
  1972   – Dean Roland, American singer-songwriter and guitarist
  1972   – Alexei Zhitnik, Ukrainian-Russian ice hockey player
1973 – Mario Lopez, American actor, television personality, and producer
  1973   – Scott Morriss, English bass player and songwriter 
  1973   – Zach Thornton, American soccer player and coach
1974 – Asi Cohen, Israeli actor and screenwriter
  1974   – Oded Kattash, Israeli basketball player and coach
  1974   – Julio Ricardo Cruz, Argentinian footballer
  1974   – Dale Earnhardt Jr., American race car driver and actor
  1974   – Lucy Powell, English politician
  1974   – Chris Pronger, Canadian ice hockey player
1975 – Ihsahn, Norwegian singer-songwriter, guitarist, and producer
  1975   – Ramón Morales, Mexican footballer and manager
  1975   – Plácido Polanco, Dominican-American baseball player
1976 – Bob Burnquist, Brazilian-American skateboarder
  1976   – Pat Burrell, American baseball player
  1976   – Shane Doan, Canadian ice hockey player
1978 – Scott Dobie, English footballer
  1978   – Jodi Lyn O'Keefe, American model and actress
  1978   – Naomi Levari, Israeli film producer and director
1979 – Kangta, South Korean singer-songwriter, producer, and actor 
  1979   – Nicolás Massú, Chilean tennis player
  1979   – Mýa, American singer-songwriter, producer, dancer, and actress
  1979   – Joel Przybilla, American basketball player
  1979   – Hitomi Satō, Japanese actress
1980 – Blaž Emeršič, Slovenian ice hockey player
  1980   – Casey FitzSimmons, American football player
  1980   – Elvis Hammond, Ghanaian footballer
  1980   – Tim Maurer, American singer-songwriter 
1981 – Una Foden, Irish singer-songwriter and dancer 
  1981   – Gavin Shuker, English lawyer and politician
1982 – Yasser Al-Qahtani, Saudi Arabian footballer
  1982   – Amon Buchanan, Australian footballer
  1982   – David Cal, Spanish sprint canoeist
  1982   – Tony Khan, American sports executive
  1982   – Dan Stevens, English actor
1983 – Vusimuzi Sibanda, Zimbabwean cricketer
  1983   – Nikos Spyropoulos, Greek footballer
  1983   – Tolga Zengin, Turkish footballer
1984 – Stephanie Cheng, Hong Kong singer
  1984   – Jean-Baptiste Grange, French skier
  1984   – Lzzy Hale, American singer-songwriter and guitarist
  1984   – Ryan Hollins, American basketball commentator
  1984   – Chiaki Kuriyama, Japanese actress and singer
  1984   – Paul Posluszny, American football player
  1984   – Troy Tulowitzki, American baseball player
1985 – Dominique Cornu, Belgian cyclist
  1985   – Bronson Harrison, New Zealand rugby league player
  1985   – Marina Diamandis, Welsh singer-songwriter and pianist
  1985   – Sandra Záhlavová, Czech tennis player
1986 – Ezequiel Garay, Argentinian footballer
  1986   – Lucy Griffiths, English actress
  1986   – Nathan Jawai, Australian basketball player
  1986   – Andrew McCutchen, American baseball player 
  1986   – Ellen Andrea Wang, Norwegian bassist and composer
1987 – Rodjun Cruz, Filipino actor and dancer
  1987   – Ryan Mathews, American football player
  1987   – Colin Slade, New Zealand rugby player
  1987   – Junior Madozein, Central African basketball player
1988 – Luis Cardozo, Paraguayan footballer
  1988   – Shaun Fensom, Australian rugby league player
  1988   – Brown Ideye, Nigerian footballer
  1988   – Rose McIver, New Zealand actress
  1988   – Emmanuel Nwachi, Nigerian footballer
  1988   – Toby Smith, Australian-New Zealand rugby player
1989 – Emer Kenny, English actress and screenwriter
  1989   – Aimee Teegarden, American actress and producer
1990 – Geno Smith, American football player
1991 – Michael Carter-Williams, American basketball player
  1991   – Gabriella Cilmi, Australian singer-songwriter and producer
  1991   – Lali Espósito, Argentinian actress and singer 
  1991   – Mariana Pajón, Colombian cyclist
  1991   – Xherdan Shaqiri, Swiss footballer
1993 – Lourdes Gurriel Jr., Cuban baseball player
  1993   – Jayden Stockley, English footballer
1994 – Ilya Mikheyev, Russian ice hockey player
  1994   – Marquez Valdes-Scantling, American football player
  1994   – Tereza Smitková, Czech tennis player
  1994   – Bae Suzy, South Korean singer, actress and model
1995 – Brenko Lee, Australian-born Tongan rugby league player
  1995   – Courtland Sutton, American football player
1996 – Sami Niku, Finnish ice hockey player
1996 – Genesis Cabrera, Dominican baseball player 
1997 – Vinnie Pasquantino, American baseball player
2002 – Josh Giddey, Australian basketball player

Deaths

Pre-1600
AD 19 – Germanicus, Roman general (b. 15 BC)
 644 – Paulinus of York, English bishop and missionary 
 680 – Abbas ibn Ali, son of Imam Ali
   680   – Ali al-Akbar ibn Husayn, son of Al-Husayn
   680   – Habib ibn Madhahir
   680   – Husayn ibn Ali, third Shia Imam and grandson of Muhammad (b. 626)
 827 – Pope Valentine (b. 800)
 937 – Wang Lingmou, chancellor of Wu
1149 – Al-Hafiz, Fatimid imam-caliph (b. 1074/77)
1213 – Frederick II, Duke of Lorraine
1308 – Patrick Dunbar, 8th Earl of Dunbar
1359 – Hugh IV of Cyprus (b. 1295)
1503 – Peter II, Duke of Bourbon (b. 1438)
1581 – Bayinnaung, Burmese king (b. 1516)

1601–1900
1659 – Abel Tasman, Dutch merchant and explorer (b. 1603)
1691 – Isaac de Benserade, French author and poet (b. 1613)
1708 – David Gregory, Scottish mathematician and astronomer (b. 1659)
1714 – Pierre Le Pesant, sieur de Boisguilbert, French economist and academic (b. 1646)
1720 – Antoine Coysevox, French sculptor (b. 1640)
1723 – William Cowper, 1st Earl Cowper, English lawyer and politician, Lord High Chancellor of Great Britain (b. 1665)
1725 – Philippe de Rigaud Vaudreuil, French politician, Governor of New France (b. 1643)
1747 – John Potter, English archbishop and academic (b. 1674)
1759 – Granville Elliott, English general (b. 1713)
1765 – Lionel Sackville, 1st Duke of Dorset, English politician, Lord Lieutenant of Ireland (b. 1688)
1795 – Francesco Antonio Zaccaria, Italian historian and theologian (b. 1714)
1800 – Gabriel Prosser, American rebel leader (b. 1776)
1806 – Prince Louis Ferdinand of Prussia (b. 1772)
1827 – Ugo Foscolo, Italian author and poet (b. 1778)
1837 – Charles Fourier, French philosopher and academic (b. 1772)
1857 – George Washington Parke Custis, American author and playwright (b. 1781)
1872 – William H. Seward, American lawyer and politician, 24th United States Secretary of State (b. 1801)
1875 – Aleksey Konstantinovich Tolstoy, Russian author, poet, and playwright (b. 1817)
1876 – Charles Joseph Sainte-Claire Deville, French geologist and meteorologist (b. 1814)
1893 – Lip Pike, American baseball player and manager (b. 1845)

1901–present
1901 – Lorenzo Snow, American religious leader, 5th President of The Church of Jesus Christ of Latter-day Saints (b. 1814)
1913 – Adolphus Busch, German-American brewer and businessman, co-founded Anheuser-Busch (b. 1839)
  1913   – Katsura Tarō, Japanese general and politician, 6th Prime Minister of Japan (b. 1848)
1914 – Carol I of Romania (b. 1839)
1918 – Henry Dobson, Australian politician, 17th Premier of Tasmania (b. 1841)
1922 – Andreas Karkavitsas, Greek physician and author (b. 1866)
1927 – August Kitzberg, Estonian author and playwright (b. 1855)
  1927   – Gustave Whitehead, German-American pilot and engineer (b. 1874)
1930 – Adolf Engler, German botanist and academic (b. 1844)
1935 – Gustave Loiseau, French painter (b. 1865)
1940 – Berton Churchill, Canadian-American actor and singer (b. 1876)
1942 – Arnold Majewski, Finnish military hero of Polish descent (killed in action) (b. 1892)
1948 – Ted Horn, American race car driver (b. 1910)
1949 – Chikuhei Nakajima, Japanese engineer, businessman, and politician, founded Nakajima Aircraft Company (b. 1884)
1953 – Erima Harvey Northcroft, New Zealand general, lawyer, and judge (b. 1884)
1957 – Karl Genzken, German physician (b. 1885)
1962 – Stancho Belkovski, Bulgarian-Polish architect (b. 1891)
1963 – Roy Cazaly, Australian footballer and coach (b. 1893)
  1963   – Édith Piaf, French singer-songwriter and actress (b. 1915)
1964 – Eddie Cantor, American singer-songwriter, dancer, and actor (b. 1892)
  1964   – Heinrich Neuhaus, Ukrainian-Russian pianist and educator (b. 1888)
1966 – Charlotte Cooper, English-Scottish tennis player (b. 1870)
  1966   – Louise Thuliez, French school teacher, resistance fighter during World War I and World War II and author (b. 1881)
1970 – Édouard Daladier, French captain and politician, 105th Prime Minister of France (b. 1884)
1971 – John Cawte Beaglehole, New Zealand historian and scholar (b. 1901)
1973 – Ludwig von Mises, Ukrainian-American economist and sociologist (b. 1881)
1974 – Werner Heyking, Danish actor (b. 1913)
  1974   – Joseph Wulf, German-Polish historian (b. 1912)
1976 – Silvana Armenulić, Bosnian singer and actress (b. 1939)
  1976   – Mirsada Mirjana Bajraktarević, Bosnian singer-songwriter (b. 1951)
1977 – Angelo Muscat, Maltese-English actor (b. 1930)
1978 – Ralph Marterie, Italian-American trumpet player and bandleader (b. 1914)
  1978   – Ralph Metcalfe, American sprinter and politician (b. 1910)
1979 – Christopher Evans, English psychologist, computer scientist, and author (b. 1931)
  1979   – Paul Paray, French organist, composer, and conductor (b. 1886)
1982 – Jean Effel, French painter and journalist (b. 1908)
1983 – Ralph Richardson, English actor (b. 1902)
1985 – Yul Brynner, Russian actor (b. 1920)
  1985   – Orson Welles, American actor, director, producer, and screenwriter (b. 1915)
1986 – Gleb Wataghin, Ukrainian-Italian physicist and academic (b. 1899)
1987 – Behice Boran, Turkish Marxist politician, author and sociologist (b. 1910)
1990 – Tom Murton, American penologist and activist (b. 1928)
  1990   – Nikolaos Pavlopoulos, Greek sculptor and academic (b. 1909)
1991 – Nickolaus Hirschl, Austrian wrestler, discus thrower, and shot putter (b. 1906)
1997 – Michael J. S. Dewar, Indian-born American theoretical chemist who developed the Dewar–Chatt–Duncanson model (b. 1918)
1998 – Clark Clifford, American captain, lawyer, and politician 9th United States Secretary of Defense (b. 1906)
  1998   – Marvin Gay, Sr., American minister (b. 1914)
  1998   – Tommy Quaid, Irish hurler and manager (b. 1957)
2000 – Sirimavo Bandaranaike, Sri Lankan lawyer and politician, 6th Prime Minister of Sri Lanka (b. 1916)
2001 – Eddie Futch, American boxer and trainer (b. 1911)
  2001   – Vasily Mishin, Russian engineer (b. 1917)
2003 – Eila Hiltunen, Finnish sculptor (b. 1922)
  2003   – Eugene Istomin, American pianist (b. 1925)
2004 – Ken Caminiti, American baseball player (b. 1963)
  2004   – Christopher Reeve, American actor, producer, and activist (b. 1952)
  2004   – Arthur H. Robinson, American geographer and cartographer (b. 1915)
  2004   – Maurice Shadbolt, New Zealand author and playwright (b. 1932)
2005 – Wayne C. Booth, American educator and critic (b. 1921)
  2005   – Milton Obote, Ugandan politician, 2nd President of Uganda (b. 1925)
2006 – Michael John Rogers, English ornithologist and academic (b. 1932)
  2006   – Ian Scott, Canadian lawyer and politician (b. 1934)
2008 – Kazuyoshi Miura, Japanese businessman (b. 1947)
2009 – Stephen Gately, Irish singer-songwriter, dancer, and actor (b. 1976)
2010 – Solomon Burke, American singer-songwriter and preacher (b. 1940)
  2010   – Joan Sutherland, Australian-Swiss soprano and actress (b. 1926)
2011 – Jagjit Singh, Indian singer-songwriter (b. 1941)
2012 – Sam Gibbons, American captain and politician (b. 1920)
  2012   – Alex Karras, American football player, wrestler, and actor (b. 1935)
  2012   – Piotr Lenartowicz, Polish philosopher and educator (b. 1934)
  2012   – Basil L. Plumley, American sergeant (b. 1920)
  2012   – Mark Poster, American philosopher and educator (b. 1941)
  2012   – Kyaw Zaw, Burmese commander and politician (b. 1919)
2013 – Scott Carpenter, American commander, pilot, and astronaut (b. 1925)
  2013   – Jay Conrad Levinson, American author and educator (b. 1933)
  2013   – Sohei Miyashita, Japanese politician, Japanese Minister of Defense (b. 1927)
  2013   – Cal Smith, American singer and guitarist (b. 1932)
2014 – Olav Dale, Norwegian saxophonist and composer (b. 1958)
  2014   – Damiana Eugenio, Filipino author and academic (b. 1921)
  2014   – Valeri Karpov, Russian ice hockey player (b. 1971)
  2014   – Lari Ketner, American football and basketball player (b. 1977)
  2014   – Pavel Landovský, Czech actor, director, and playwright (b. 1936)
  2014   – Ed Nimmervoll, Austrian-Australian journalist, historian, and author (b. 1947)
2015 – Diepreye Alamieyeseigha, Nigerian politician, Governor of Bayelsa State (b. 1952)
  2015   – Hilla Becher, German photographer and educator (b. 1934)
  2015   – Manorama, Indian (Tamil) actress (b. 1937)
  2015   – Steve Mackay, American saxophonist and composer (b. 1949)
  2015   – Sybil Stockdale, American activist, co-founded the National League of Families (b. 1924)
2016 – Donn Fendler, American author and speaker (b. 1926)
2021 – Abdul Qadeer Khan, Pakistani nuclear physicist and metallurgical scientist (b. 1936)
2022 – Mulayam Singh Yadav, Indian politician, 15th Chief Minister of Uttar Pradesh (b. 1939)

Holidays and observances
Arbor Day (Poland)
Army Day (Sri Lanka)
Capital Liberation Day (Vietnam)
Christian feast day:
Blessed Angela Truszkowska
Cerbonius
Daniel Comboni
Eulampius and Eulampia
Gereon and companions
Blessed María Catalina Irigoyen Echegaray (Maria Desposorios)
Paulinus of York (in England)
Pinytus
Tanca 
Vida Dutton Scudder (Episcopal Church)
Viktor of Xanten
October 10 (Eastern Orthodox liturgics)
Constitution Day (Sint Maarten)
Curaçao Day, anniversary of autonomy
Double Ten Day (The National Day of Republic of China), celebrates outbreak of the Wuchang Uprising in 1911 that led to founding of the Republic of China in 1912
Fiji Day, celebrates the independence of Fiji from United Kingdom in 1970
Finnish Literature Day (Finland)
Independence Day, commemorates the proclamation of Cuba's independence from Spain and the beginning of the Ten Years' War in 1868.
Party Foundation Day (North Korea)
World Day Against the Death Penalty
World Mental Health Day
World Porridge Day

References

External links

 
 
 

Days of the year
October